María del Mar Jover Pérez (born 21 April 1988, in Alicante) is a long jumper from Spain. She competed at the 2015 World Championships in Beijing without recording a legal jump.
 
Her personal bests in the event are 6.78 metres outdoors (+0.2 m/s, Monachil 2014) and 6.43 metres indoors (Monachil 2014).

Competition record

References

Spanish female long jumpers
Living people
Place of birth missing (living people)
1988 births
World Athletics Championships athletes for Spain
Athletes (track and field) at the 2016 Summer Olympics
Olympic athletes of Spain
Competitors at the 2011 Summer Universiade
Competitors at the 2013 Summer Universiade